Darwen Library is a Carnegie library in Darwen, Lancashire, England. It opened in 1908 and is located on Knott Street.

History
The library was officially opened in May 1908 by Andrew Carnegie, who had donated £8,000 to build it.  It has continued to provide book-lending services to members of the local community.

Centenary of library
As part of the library's centenary celebrations in 2008, the library ran a number of events throughout May. In April 2008, local brewers Fallons Exquisite Ales announced they had created a new beer and were dedicating it to the library.

References

Library buildings completed in 1908
Carnegie libraries in England
Public libraries in Lancashire
Buildings and structures in Blackburn with Darwen
Darwen
1908 establishments in England
Grade II listed buildings in Lancashire